S.J Jacob is the principal of Al Ameer English School, Ajman and received the best teacher award from the President of India in 2014. He is also the founder president of Ernakulam Pravasi Welfare Association. Hailing from Neyyanttinkara in Trivandrum, Jacob is the son of the late. Junson Jacob and Leela Judson. He is married to Saly Jacob, who is a teacher in Al Ameer English School,Ajman. They have two children, Jubin Jacob and Juneeta Jacob.

References

External links
Official Facebook Page

Heads of schools in the United Arab Emirates
Living people
Year of birth missing (living people)